Mango pomelo sago is a type of contemporary Hong Kong dessert. It usually includes diced mango, pomelo, sago, coconut milk, and milk. It can be found in many Chinese restaurants and dessert stores in Hong Kong as well as Singapore, Malaysia, Guangdong, and Taiwan. Over time, this dessert has evolved into many different variations; for example, it can serve as a flavor for other desserts and drinks.

Origin 
The Chinese name of "mango pomelo sago" (楊枝甘露, literally "willow branch manna") comes from the concept of dropping manna from a willow branch which makes people feel refreshed when they taste it. It was also the secret tool of the Guanyin according to the traditional Chinese mythology Journey to the West.

This dessert was said to be invented by Lei Garden in 1984 when it decided to set up its first branch in Singapore. Wong Wing-chee, the former head chef of the Lei Garden, alleges to have invented mango pomelo sago as a new dish of the Lei Garden. Inspired by the local ingredients in Singapore, Wong decided to make a dessert featuring mango, pomelo, and sago.

However, there is another version of the origin saying that this dessert was invented by the Lei Garden in order to make good use of the leftover pomelo after making Lo Hei in Chinese New Year.

Recipe 
Typical ingredients include diced mango, sliced pomelo, sago, coconut milk, evaporated milk and milk. First, boil the sago while blending mango, coconut milk, evaporated milk and milk in the blender. When the sago begins to float and turns transparent, rinse and cool it. Then, pour the mixture into a bowl together with the cooked sago and mix well. Lastly, the pomelo is put on top of the mixture for decoration. All these ingredients may be chilled beforehand to improve the taste of this dessert.

Variations 
Many new mango pomelo sago-based desserts have become popular, including:
 Pudding, ice cream and ice lolly with the flavour of mango pomelo sago
  Mango pomelo sago flavor of snow skin mooncake for Mid-Autumn Festival
  Mango pomelo sago can be served alongside tofu pudding(douhua), coffee or aloe vera 
  Bottled mango pomelo sago flavoured drinks
  Rice ball (tangyuan) and grass jelly may be used to substitute for sago in the recipe 
  Mango pomelo sago flavoured cake during Chinese New Year

See also
 Mango pudding
 List of Chinese desserts
 List of desserts

References

Hong Kong desserts
Foods containing coconut